Franklin Miller is a US government official.

Franklin Miller may also refer to:

Franklin D. Miller (1945–2000), United States Army soldier and Medal of Honor recipient
Franklin Clark Miller (1938–2008), American football player
Franklin G. Miller (born 1948), American bioethicist
Franklin F. Miller, politician in South Carolina

See also
Frank Miller (disambiguation) 
Al Millar (Franklin Allan Millar, 1929–1987), Canadian ice hockey goaltender